45737 Benita, provisional designation  is a bright background asteroid from the outer regions of the asteroid belt, approximately 5 kilometers in diameter. It was discovered on 22 April 2000, by American amateur astronomer Bruce Segal at the Florida Atlantic University's Jupiter Observatory in Boca Raton, Florida.

Orbit and classification 

Benita is a non-family asteroid from the main belt's background population. It orbits the Sun in the outer asteroid belt at a distance of 3.0–3.3 AU once every 5 years and 9 months (2,087 days; semi-major axis of 3.20 AU). Its orbit has an eccentricity of 0.05 and an inclination of 10° with respect to the ecliptic. The body's observation arc begins with a precovery taken at Lincoln Laboratory's ETS, New Mexico, on 30 October 1997.

Physical characteristics

Diameter and albedo 

According to the survey carried out by the NEOWISE mission of NASA's Wide-field Infrared Survey Explorer, Benita measures 5.121 kilometers in diameter and its surface has an albedo of 0.294.

Rotation period 

As of 2017, no rotational lightcurve of Benita has been obtained from photometric observations. The body's rotation period, poles and shape remain unknown.

Naming 

The discoverer named this minor planet after his wife, Benita Segal (born 1964), a major supporter of the observatory. The official naming citation was published by the Minor Planet Center on 20 November 2002.

References

External links 
 Asteroid Lightcurve Database (LCDB), query form (info )
 Dictionary of Minor Planet Names, Google books
 Asteroids and comets rotation curves, CdR – Observatoire de Genève, Raoul Behrend
 Discovery Circumstances: Numbered Minor Planets (45001)-(50000) – Minor Planet Center
 
 

045737
Named minor planets
20000422